The Central Polish Electoral Committee (LCRK) was a political party in interwar Lithuania.

History
The LCRK contested the first parliamentary elections in Lithuania in 1920, receiving 4.3% of the vote and winning three seats. The 1922 elections saw the party reduced to two seats.

In the 1923 elections the party won four seats, and retained all four in the 1926 elections. However, a military coup saw the Seimas dissolved in December 1926 and no further multi-party elections were held again until the 1990s.

References

Defunct political parties in Lithuania
Political parties of minorities